Abramavičiai Palace is a building in Vilnius Old Town, Rotušė square. Currently it is owned by Vilnius Juozas Tallat-Kelpša conservatory.

History 
In 1697, there was a masonry building, owned by merchant Kristapas Staškevičius. After conflagration in 1748, the house was rebuilt by Starodub elder Andrius Abramavičius.

Essential reconstruction was made in 1780 with Marcin Knackfus project. After World War II it was Juozas Tallat-Kelpša High School of Music, which later was transformed into conservatory.

External links 
 Vilnius Juozas Tallat-Kelpša conservatory

Palaces in Vilnius
Classicism architecture in Lithuania
Houses completed in 1697
1697 establishments in the Polish–Lithuanian Commonwealth